Juan Martínez Martin (born 25 November 1980 in Granada) is a track and field athlete from Spain. He competed in the  T46 classification. He competed at the 2000 Summer Paralympics in Sydney, Australia, winning a silver medal in the 4 X 400 meter T42-T46 relay.

References

External links 
 
 

1980 births
Living people
Spanish male sprinters
Paralympic silver medalists for Spain
Sportspeople from Granada
Athletes (track and field) at the 2000 Summer Paralympics
Paralympic athletes of Spain
Spanish amputees
Sprinters with limb difference
Spanish disability athletes
Male competitors in athletics with disabilities
Paralympic medalists in athletics (track and field)
Medalists at the 2000 Summer Paralympics
Paralympic sprinters